Chopsticks is an Indian Hindi-language comedy drama film directed by Sachin Yardi and produced by Ashvini Yardi. It stars Abhay Deol and Mithila Palkar in the lead roles. 
The film is a story of a woman who is referred to an enigmatic con man who agrees to help recover her stolen car from a thug for free, and how it brings about change in their lives. It was released on 31 May 2019 worldwide on Netflix.

Plot 
Nirma Sahastrabuddhe (Mithila Palkar) is a Mandarin translator who works at a travel agency. One day she buys her own car, and is very happy and excited for it. But on the very night, her new car gets stolen. She reports the stealing to police, but later meets a newly arrested thief, who tells her that those useless police will never find her car, and if she wants to find her car, it has to be within three days, or her car will either be transported out of the city or be taken apart for spare parts. He also suggest her visit someone nicknamed artist for help, saying artist is a legendary conman and the only person able to recover her car within three days.

She meets artist (Abhay Deol) the next day, who is indeed a legendary conman and a cooking lover. Artist agrees to help her. Using his broad connection in his profession, he easily finds the whereabout of the car. But when Nirma and artist arrive to collect her car, they find it has already been destroyed, leaving Nirma very saddened.

However, artist's friend cheated him and gave him the wrong information. Nirma's car is not destroyed, but instead gifted to a gangster Faiyaz Bhai (Vijay Raaz). Artist and Nirma later both learn it. Artist does not want to try to take it from Faiyaz Bhai because he cannot take the risk of messing with Faiyaz Bhai, but Nirma manages to persuade him.

Faiyaz Bhai has a pet goat named Bahubali and loves him very much. Nirma and artist comes up with the idea of kidnapping Bahubali, and asks Faiyez Bhai to return her car as exchange. They later successfully carry out the plan of kidnapping Bahubali, and demand him to return the car as exchange.

Faiyaz Bhai shortly finds it's artist and Nirma that kidnapped Bahubali. Artist also learns they have been exposed, so he and Nirma run from Faiyaz Bhai's men. Later, Nirma returns Bahubali to Faiyaz Bhai and apologizes to him, saying she only wanted to have her car back, but later realized it was wrong because Fayaz Bhai thought of Bahubali as a child and must be very sad to lose him, just as sad as she was when she lost her car.

Faiyaz Bhai is very moved, and returns Nirma's car to her.

Cast 
 Abhay Deol as Artist, a con man
 Mithila Palkar as Nirma Sahastrabuddhe, a Mandarin translator
Abhishek Bhalerao as Siddhivinayak Cop
 Vijay Raaz as Faiyaz Bhai
 Benafsha Soonawalla as Ananya 
 Achint Kaur as Zacharia 
 Narendra Khatri as Farooq, a caterer
 Arun Kushwath as UdanKhatola
Abhilash Joshi as Wifi Guy

Marketing and release 
A teaser of the film was released in the first week of May. It introduced the protagonist of the film. The trailer was released later in May by Netflix. Cast by Paragg Mehta.

Reception 
Rohan Naahar of the Hindustan Times rates the film with two out of five stars. He feels it has muddled story which is low on comedy, and writes, "Like the inconvenient cutlery it is named after, there’s little reason to try it if there are alternatives to be found." Shrishti Negi of the News18 also rates the film with two out of five stars and opines that the film never rose to its true potential. Anupama Chopra of Film Companion opines that the humour inherent in a sitcom has not come out as the film scenes are preposterous. Akash of High On Films wrote, "Despite having so much talent in the acting department, the script hardly seems to have any direction or a sense of purpose."

References

External links 
 

2010s Hindi-language films
Indian comedy-drama films
Hindi-language Netflix original films
2019 films
Indian direct-to-video films
2019 comedy-drama films
Films directed by Sachin Yardi
2019 direct-to-video films